This list of 18th-century British periodicals excludes daily newspapers.

The Tatler (1709—1711)
The Female Tatler (8 July 1709—31 March 1710). Thrice weekly; 115 issues
The Spectator (1711–1714). Founded by Joseph Addison and Richard Steele;  published daily, 1711–1712; in 1714, three times a week for six months. Collected in book form it remained hugely popular for the rest of the century.
Vetusta Monumenta (1718–1906). Illustrated antiquarian papers published at intermittent intervals by the Society of Antiquaries of London.
The Intelligencer (1728—1729). Launched by Jonathan Swift and Thomas Sheridan
The Gentleman's Magazine (1731–1907). Monthly.
The London Magazine (1732–1785)
The Bee (1733–1735). Founded by Eustace Budgell.
Lloyd's List (1734–). Weekly, then semi-weekly.
The Scots Magazine (1739–1826).
 The Female Spectator (1744—1746). Monthly; 24 issues 
The Universal Magazine of Knowledge and Pleasure (1747–1814). Monthly. Editors included James Hinton, W. Bent, and Percival Stockdale.
The Monthly Review (1749–1845). Monthly. Founded by Ralph Griffiths and Robert Dodsley. Oliver Goldsmith was a contributor.
The Rambler (1750–1752). Twice weekly.
The Adventurer (1752–1754).  Twice weekly. Founded by John Hawkesworth, Samuel Johnson, and others.
The World (1753–1756).  Every Thursday.  Founded by "Adam Fitz-Adam" (i.e. Edwin Moore) and published by the Dodsleys.  
The Connoisseur (1754–1756). Weekly.
The Critical Review (1756–1817)
The London Chronicle (1756-1823). Thrice weekly.
The Annual Register (1758–). Annually.
Universal Chronicle, which published Samuel Johnson'sThe Idler (1758–1760)
The Bee (1759–1759)
 The Lady's Museum (1760—1761): monthly 
Exeter Mercury or West Country Advertiser, later Trewman's Exeter Flying Post (1763–1917)
The Gospel Magazine (1766–)
Theological Repository (1769–1771, 1784, 1786, 1788)
Town and Country Magazine (1769–)
The Lady's Magazine (1770–1837). Monthly.
The Building Magazine (1774–1778)
Wesleyan Methodist Magazine (1778–1969). Monthly
The Arminian Magazine (1778–1913)
 The European Magazine, and London Review (1782–1826). Founded by James Perry; later edited by Isaac Reed.
A New Review (1782–1786). Edited by Paul Henry Maty.
Annals of Agriculture (1784–1815). Started by Arthur Young.
The New Town & Country Magazine (1787–1789)
The Analytical Review (1788–1799)
The Botanical Magazine, subsequently Curtis's Botanical Magazine (1787–)
The Observer (1791–). Weekly.
The Sporting Magazine. (1792–). Monthly.
British Critic. Quarterly (1793–1826)
Anthologia hibernica (1793–1794). Published in Dublin.
The Monthly Mirror (1795–1811). Founded by Thomas Bellamy.
The Tribune (1795–1796). Edited by John Thelwall
The Aberdeen Magazine, Or, Universal Repository. (1796–1798)
The Monthly Magazine (1796–1825). Founded by Sir Richard Phillips, edited by John Aikin
The Watchman (1796). Founded and edited by Samuel Taylor Coleridge
The Anti-Jacobin, or, Weekly Examiner (1797–1798)
The Anti-Jacobin Review (1798–1821)
The Philosophical Magazine (1798–)
The Asiatic annual register (1799–1811)
Conjuror's Magazine (1791–1794?)
The Lady's Monthly Museum (1798—1832)

See also
 List of 18th-century British periodicals for women
 List of eighteenth century journals
 List of nineteenth-century British periodicals

References

Lists of publications
Periodicals
Defunct literary magazines published in the United Kingdom
Periodicals, British
18th-century British literature
British literature-related lists
Per